Moses Sesay is the current Mayor of the City of Makeni in the Bombali district of Northern Sierra Leone.

Mr Sesay is the sixth of eleven children born to Edward Sallu Sesay and 'Tha' Kadiatu Sesay presently residents at the Azzolini Highway, Magbente Junction; in the outskirts of the City of Makeni.

Mr Sesay was elected at the recently concluded Local Government Elections on 5 July 2008. A formal handing over from the outgoing Mayor Alhaji Andrew Kanu took place early in August after the Official inauguration of all the elected Councillors; Chairmen and the Mayor, of the Region.

References

Mayors of places in Sierra Leone
People from Bombali District
Year of birth missing (living people)
Living people